The year 521 BC was a year of the pre-Julian Roman calendar. In the Roman Empire, it was known as year 233  Ab urbe condita. The denomination 521 BC for this year has been used since the early medieval period, when the Anno Domini calendar era became the prevalent method in Europe for naming years.

Events

By place

Persian Empire 
 Darius I succeeded Gaumata as ruler of Persia.

Births 
 Leonidas I. King of Sparta

Deaths 
 March – Cambyses, ruler of ancient Persia (suicide)
 October – Gaumata, ruler of ancient Persia

References 

 
520s BC